In the run up to the 2022 Hungarian parliamentary election, various organizations carry out opinion polling to gauge voting intention in Hungary. Results of such polls are displayed in this article.

Graphical summary

National polling results

United Opposition list

Individual parties

No party preferences

Uncertainty polling

Seat projections

Regions polling results

Budapest

Diaspora polls

Notes

References 

Opinion polling in Hungary